As to the Meaning of Words is a stage play written by Mark Eichman, a slightly fictionalized account of a 1975 court case in which a physician who had performed a seemingly legal abortion was afterwards charged with manslaughter. The play premiered in New York in 1981, and while the names of the people involved had been changed, the facts of the case very much remained intact in this courtroom drama.

Summary

The play opened in June 1981 at the American Theater of Actors in New York. The doctor accused of manslaughter (whose real name was Dr. Kenneth Edelin), here named Dr. Winston Gerrard, is portrayed as a rather passive character; on the opposite end of the scale is the aggressive prosecutor, with the defense counsel in the middle. There is a rather large number of witnesses for both sides. The play does not seem to favor either side or position, but is very much "just the facts".

Reception

Some reviewers criticized the author for not taking sides. The New York Times commented that "Mr. Eichman's scrupulous fairness might serve him better if he were a judge rather than a playwright."  Critics were generally satisfied with the "competent cast", but found the material all in all lacked drama.

Cast and crew

Presented by the New York Theater Studio (artistic director: Richard V. Romagnoli; managing director: Cheryl Faraone), written by Mark Eichman, and directed by Ted Snowden, the play premiered in June 1981 at the American Theater of Actors, 314 West 54th Street, with the following cast:

Dr. Winston Gerrard - Ron Foster

Alexander Thomas - Joel Fabiani

Ned Ryan - John Bentley

Judge Horace J. Wheeting - Thomas Ruisinger

Dr. Madelyn Foster - Fran Salisbury

Dr. Ramon Norriega - Felipe Gorostiza

Dr. Clarence Parrish - Bill McCutcheon

Dr. Jonathan Wallace - Dann Florek

Nurse Gloria Sanders - Stephanie Musnick

Clerk - Sally Burnett

Voices - Harry Bennet & Mary Cunniff

References

1981 plays
Courtroom dramas